Provoke (Purovōku), with its subtitle of Provocative Materials for Thought (Shisō no tame no chōhatsuteki shiryō ), was an experimental small press Japanese photography magazine founded in 1968 by critic/photographers Kōji Taki and Takuma Nakahira, photographer Yutaka Takanashi, and writer . Daidō Moriyama joined with the second issue. Provoke was "a platform for a new photographic expression", "to free photography from subservience to the language of words", "that stood in opposition to the photography establishment". It was a quarterly magazine that also included poetry, criticism and photographic theory. Provoke has been described as having "lasted for only three issues" but with "profound effect upon Japanese photography in the 1970s and 80s," and is said to have "spread a completely new idea of photography in Japan."

Details
The three issues of Provoke magazine were published on 1 November 1968, and 10 March and 10 August 1969, each in an edition of 1,000 copies.

The Provoke manifesto declared that visual images cannot completely represent an idea as words can, yet photographs can provoke language and ideas, "resulting in a new language and in new meanings"; the photographer can capture what cannot be expressed in words, presenting photographs as "documents" for others to read, hence Provoke'''s "provocative materials for thought" subtitle.

On 31 March 1970 the collective published the book 4. Mazu tashikarashisa no sekai o suterō: Shashin to gengo no shisō (First Abandon the World of Pseudo-Certainty: Thoughts on Photography and Language), through Tabata Shoten. A review of the group's activity, it is regarded as the Provoke No. 4 that is mentioned in No. 3.

All three issues of Provoke appeared in The Open Book, a traveling exhibition that tracked "the history of the photographic medium in the twentieth century through printed images in book form".

Work from Provoke was shown in the 2016/2017 touring exhibition Provoke: Between Protest and Performance – Photography in Japan 1960/1975 at Albertina in Vienna, Fotomuseum Winterthur in Switzerland, Le Bal in Paris and the Art Institute of Chicago.

Critic Gerry Badger has written that the "legendary Japanese magazine, Provoke, lasted for only three issues, but had a profound effect upon Japanese photography in the 1970s and 80s".

 Historical Background 
According to historian Nick Kapur, the early 1960s saw political struggle in Japan reach its high point because of the United States-Japan Security Treaty (ANPO for short in Japanese) was due for revision. The treaty would allow the US to maintain military bases in Japan and was protested from 1959 to 1960. A majority of the left wing within Japan saw that it as a symbol of growing US influence on the Japanese political landscape. This was especially evident in universities where young people were becoming disillusioned with the political situation. Due to rigid standards for art imposed by the communist government that became dominant during the postwar period, up to the late 1950s, Japanese artists became increasingly frustrated at their lack of freedom. Coupled with the Japanese economic boom during the 1950s to 1970s, it was becoming increasingly more viable for artists to make a living off of their art alone.

Along with the political turmoil, the 1960s saw the expansion of a number of artistic movements. Provoke was part of the photographic movement that arose out of the late 1960s and was motivated by the opposition artists had felt towards the traditional powers of Japan. Now with increased political awareness, artists turned their eye towards the societal changes that had occurred during a period of strong economic growth. As a result of the political unrest, the Japanese government reacted by boosting public campaigns to spread their ideologies, mainly through the promise of a brighter future by encouraging increased consumption habits. Taki saw the potential for a new form of documentary photography that could inform his anti-government message and bring about changes in the cultural landscape.

During the early 1960s, Tomatsu Shomei was considered by many art critics as the leading photographer in Japan. He was a member of the photography agency VIVO, largely modeled after the prestigious European collective Magnum Photos. Tomatsu became a mentor to a new generation of up-and-coming photographers, which included Koji Taki, Takuma Nakahira, and Moriyama Daido. It was during the preparations for the “Shashin 100-nen" (A Century of Japanese Photography) exhibition, where Taki was able to oversee the selection of hundreds of works by Japanese photographers. It was also during this time where Taki felt that the dominant ideologies of the government had begun influencing the artistic choices made by Japanese photographers. He felt that the "neutrality of art" was being threatened, thus creating the Provoke collective.

 Purpose of Provoke 
Members of Provoke aimed to change the traditional conceptions of Japanese photography. In particular, they proposed a new direction for documentary photography that was sharply different from their predecessors. During the time of the Vietnam war, the works of Magnum photographers began circulating through the mass media, as well as other highly publicized galleries. Their work depicted the carnage of the Vietnam war, embracing a "realism" approach to documentary photography. Members of Provoke saw these photographs as appealing to universal humanity during the Cold War era. Members of Provoke sought to focus on a more personal and affective style. In his book, Kotoba no nai Shiko (Wordless Thought: Notes on Things, Space and Image), Taki wrote that it was an “attempt to dismantle the semantic environment” with the purpose “of trying to change reality”.

The first issue, Provoke Manifesto, was the first realization of the collective's philosophy. They wished to depict reality as they saw it, if "only a fragment". Photography was a medium that was able to transcend language and thought. The main focus was to convey atmosphere and energy.“Today when words have lost their material base – in other words, their reality – and seem suspended in mid-air, a photographers’ eye can capture fragments of reality that cannot be expressed in language as it is. He can submit those images as documents to be considered alongside language and ideology. This is why, brash as it may seem, Provoke has the subtitle ‘provocative documents of thought’”.

—  Provoke Manifesto, Issue 1

 Style 
Unlike many of their contemporaries, Provoke decided to focus on the monotony of urban life by choosing architecture, disenfranchised citizens, and abandoned sites as their subjects. This was in keeping with their ideals of rejecting the "traditional photographic subject". They sought to directly counter the "clean" and "functional" city that the state continued to promote during this period of economic growth.Provoke's photos were characterized through a distinctive style that was often blurry, dark and out of focus. This visual style has been said to be, in Japanese, 'are-bure-boke', translated as 'grainy/rough, blurry, out-of-focus', a style already found in mainstream magazines such as Asahi Camera and Camera Mainichi. Photographic effects such as distortion, aggressive grain and high contrast images were embraced by the group. They also often used images that other photographers would discard. These effects were a result of their experimentation with the development process of film photography, including altering industry standards for exposure times, correct temperature for the development process, and the printing process.

During a time where the Japanese mediascape was being reorganized around digital and audio-visual media, paper was gaining the perception of being outdated. Seeing its immediacy to the readers as a merit, Provoke chose to place a heavy emphasis on the medium of paper. The imperfections that lied within the printing process, such as the loss of detail in prints, were also embraced by Provoke photographers. They frequently utilized a printing technique known as halftone, which would dramatically increase the contrast and grain of an image. The group also chose to print their publications using a square format and leaving no margins at the edges of the paper. These aggressive techniques made it seem as if the photos seemingly bled into each other.

Nakahira and Moriyama had been experimenting with 'are-bure-boke' prior to their involvement in Provoke, and Moriyama's 12-part conceptual project "Akushidento (Accident)" for Asahi Camera in 1969 took the approach in new directions. There were other comparable radical magazines and groups at the time including Geribara 5, which published three books. Asahi Journal, Kikan shashin eizō (The Photo Image) and Design also served as platforms for avant garde photography in the 'are-bure-boke' style by Nakahira, Moriyama and others.

 Disbandment 
Towards the end of the publication, doubts began to arise among members whether the magazine achieved its original purpose. While Taki remained faithful to the initial vision of the magazine, Nakahira was beginning to question whether the abstraction of their methods was having concrete effects on the external world. As a result, Nakahira left the group to pursue work that was more direct and measurable in external influence. Nakahira would then publish an essay titled in Japanese “Naze shokubutsu zukan ka?” (Why an illustrated botanical dictionary?), describing his previous efforts with Provoke as not neutral enough.

The individual works of Moriyama and Taki that came afterwards still followed much of original style and purpose of Provoke. Along with other contemporaries, these photographers would go on to be known as the “Era of Provoke”. Subsequent works by members of Provoke arguably are continuations of the ideologies that the magazine sought to spread. Works including Nakahira's “For a Language to Come”, Moriyama's "Bye Bye Photography", and Takashi's "Toshi-e Towards a City".

Academic research
The first substantial academic investigation into Provoke is Chapter 3 of Fabienne Adler's 2009 Ph.D. thesis "First, Abandon the World of Seeming Certainty: Theory and Practice of the 'Camera-Generated Image' in Nineteen-Sixties Japan" (Stanford University). In 2010 a journal article on Daidō Moriyama contextualized that photographer's photographic experimentation of the late 1960s and early 1970s in relation to his contributions to Provoke. Yuko Fujii's 2012 Ph.D. thesis on Provoke was entitled "Photography As Process: A Study of the Japanese Photography Journal Provoke" (City University of New York). Matthew Witkovsky's chapter "Provoke: Photography Up For Discussion" in the 2016 exhibition catalogue Provoke: Between Protest and Performance contains new research. An article from 2016 by Gyewon Kim proposes that Provoke used paper as a metaphor for the city, thereby critiquing the Japanese state's imposition of homogeneous urban planning and design. A lengthy 2017 article in the journal History of Photography by Philip Charrier argues that Provoke was highly theoretical in orientation. It shows that under the leadership of Taki and Nakahira, and inspired by the early writings on photography by Roland Barthes, the collective set out to create photographic imagery that could escape language and code.

IssuesProvoke 1: Shisō no tame no chōhatsuteki shiryō = Provoke 1: Provocative Resources for Thought. Tokyo: Purovōku-sha, 1968. With photographs by Nakahira, Takanashi and Taki and text by Takahiko and Taki. Edition of 1,000 copies.Provoke 2: Shisō no tame no chōhatsuteki shiryō = Provoke 2: Provocative Resources for Thought. Tokyo: Purovōku-sha, 1969. The theme was Eros. With photographs by Moriyama, Nakahira, Takanashi and Taki and text by Okada. Edition of 1,000 copies.Provoke 3: Shisō no tame no chōhatsuteki shiryō = Provoke 3: Provocative Resources for Thought. Tokyo: Purovōku-sha, 1969. With photographs by Moriyama, Nakahira, Takanashi, and Taki and text by Okada and Gōzō Yoshimasu. Edition of 1,000 copies.

Publications reproducing Provoke materialThe Japanese Box: Facsimile Reprint of Six Rare Photographic Publications of the Provoke Era, published in 2001 by Edition 7L (Paris) and Steidl (Göttingen), contains facsimiles of the three issues of Provoke (as well as Nakahira's For a Language to Come, Moriyama's Farewell Photography and Nobuyoshi Araki's Sentimental Journey) and a newly edited booklet of explanatory material in English. The Box (an actual wooden box) was made in an edition of 1500. Does not include texts by Takahiko Okada.

A catalog for the similarly named exhibition, Provoke: Between Protest and Performance, was published in 2016 by Steidl. It contains photographs from Provoke and from other photographers including Shomei Tomatsu and Araki, as well as texts from that period and newly written.Provoke: Complete Reprint of 3 Volumes was published in 2018 by Nitesha. It is a reprint of the three volumes of Provoke, including all images and all original texts (including those by Takahiko Okada) in Japanese. It also includes a supplemental volume with English and Chinese translations of the original Japanese texts.

Publications about ProvokeProvoke.'' Tokyo: Seikyusha, 1996. Mostly text, in Japanese, with some photographs.

Notes

References

1968 establishments in Japan
1969 disestablishments in Japan
Defunct magazines published in Japan
Photography magazines published in Japan
Magazines established in 1968
Magazines disestablished in 1969
Quarterly magazines